Stephen Joseph Scalise (born October 6, 1965) is an American politician who serves as the House Majority Leader and representative for . He served as the House Minority Whip from 2019 to 2023. Scalise is in his ninth House term, having held his seat since 2008. The district includes most of New Orleans's suburbs, such as Metairie, Kenner, and Slidell, as well as a portion of New Orleans itself. He is a member of the Republican Party and was the chair of the House Republican Study Committee.

Before his election to Congress, Scalise served four months in the Louisiana State Senate and three terms in the Louisiana House of Representatives. On June 19, 2014, Scalise's Republican colleagues elected him majority whip of the United States House of Representatives. He assumed office on August 1. He is the first Louisianian to serve as majority whip since Hale Boggs of Louisiana's 2nd congressional district held the position from 1962 to 1971. In 2017, Scalise became the dean of the Louisiana congressional delegation upon Senator David Vitter's retirement.

On June 14, 2017, during practice for that year's Congressional Baseball Game, Scalise was shot and seriously wounded by an anti-Trump domestic terrorist who was targeting Republicans. Scalise underwent treatment for several months, returning to Congress on September 28.

Early life and education 
Scalise was born in New Orleans, one of three children of Alfred Joseph Scalise, a real estate broker who died on October 8, 2015, at the age of 77, and Carol Schilleci. His siblings are Glenn and Tara Scalise.

Scalise's great-grandparents immigrated to the United States from Italy in the late 1800s. He graduated from Archbishop Rummel High School in Metairie in Jefferson Parish and earned a Bachelor of Science degree from Louisiana State University in Baton Rouge with a major in computer science and a minor in political science. At LSU, Scalise was a member of the Acacia Fraternity. He serves on the board of the American Italian Renaissance Foundation, servicing the American Italian Cultural Center.

Louisiana Legislature 
Republican (formerly Democratic) State Representative Quentin Dastugue made an unsuccessful bid for Governor of Louisiana in 1995, dropping out before the nonpartisan blanket primary. Scalise was recruited by state Republicans to run for Dastugue's District 82 seat in the Louisiana House of Representatives, winning his election bid. Scalise was re-elected to the seat in 1999 and 2003, serving until 2007.
His legislative peers named him to the House Appropriations Committee as the representative of the First Congressional District. Scalise opposed the 2002 Stelly Plan, a proposal by Lake Charles Representative Vic Stelly, since enacted and then repealed, to reduce certain state sales taxes on food for home consumption and utilities in exchange for higher state income taxes.

Scalise was elected in the October 20, 2007 nonpartisan blanket primary to the District 9 seat in the Louisiana Senate vacated by the term-limited Ken Hollis of Metairie. Scalise received 19,154 votes (61 percent) in a three-way contest. Fellow Republican Polly Thomas, an education professor at the University of New Orleans who subsequently won a special state House election in 2016, polled 8,948 votes (29 percent). A Democrat, David Gereighty, polled 3,154 votes (10 percent) in the heavily Republican-oriented district. Scalise, who was term-limited out of the House, was succeeded in the state House by his aide, Cameron Henry of Metairie.

In the special election on November 4, 2008, to fill the remaining three and one-half years in Scalise's state Senate term, Conrad Appel defeated Polly Thomas, 21,853 (52.1 percent) to 20,065 (47.9 percent). Thomas had also lost the race for the seat in 2007 to Scalise.

U.S. House of Representatives

Elections
2008 special election

In 2004, Scalise announced that he would run for the 1st congressional district, but deferred to the preference of party leaders and supported Bobby Jindal, who won the position vacated by the successful U.S. senatorial candidate, David Vitter.

In 2007, when Jindal was elected to the governorship of Louisiana, Scalise announced his intentions to seek the House seat again. This time he received Republican party backing.

Scalise's main opponent in the Republican primary–the real contest in this heavily Republican district–was fellow state representative State Representative Timothy G. "Tim" Burns from Mandeville in St. Tammany Parish. Burns accused Scalise of push polling, a practice in which a campaign contacts voters by telephone and asks probing questions which leave a negative impression of his opponent. Scalise defended his poll from criticism by Burns: "We were running a public opinion survey this week conducted by the largest Republican polling firm in the country, Public Opinion Strategies. . . . conducted with a sample of 300 people, and it shows Scalise at 57 percent, Burns at 26 percent and undecided at 17 percent The margin of error is 5.6 percent. We ran a fact-based public opinion survey, not a push poll."

In the March 8, 2008, Republican primary, Scalise polled 16,799 votes (48 percent). He went on to win the runoff election on April 5 against Burns, who received 9,631 votes (28 percent) in the initial primary.

In the May 3 general election, Scalise received 33,867 votes (75.13 percent) to Democrat Gilda Reed's 10,142 ballots (22.5 percent). Two minor candidates polled the remaining 2.36 percent of the vote. Reed was a favorite of organized labor and the Democratic constituency groups. The First District has been Republican since 1977, when Bob Livingston won a special election.

Scalise was sworn in on May 7, 2008.

2008 general election

In the regularly scheduled election, Scalise was reelected over Democrat Jim Harlan, 66 percent to 34 percent.

2010

Scalise defeated the Democratic nominee, Myron Katz, and an Independent, Arden Wells, in his 2010 bid for reelection.

2012

In June 2009, Scalise joined Dan Kyle, the former legislative auditor and the treasurer of the Louisiana GOP, as directors of a national presidential fund-raising effort promoting Governor Jindal. According to Kyle, the group hoped to raise $60 million to persuade Jindal to seek the 2012 party nomination. Others on the committee include former State Representative Woody Jenkins. Former Republican State Senator Tom Schedler of Slidell had his name removed from the group, not because he opposes Jindal but because such fund-raising activity could conflict with Schedler's role at the time as first assistant to Louisiana Secretary of State Jay Dardenne. In 2010, Schedler succeeded Dardenne as secretary of state.

In his own 2012 congressional race, Scalise prevailed with 193,490 votes (66.6 percent) over four opponents, the strongest of whom was the Democrat M. V. "Vinny" Mendoza, who finished with 61,979 votes (21.3 percent). A second Republican, Gary King, received 24,838 votes (8.6 percent). Independent Arden Wells ran again and received 4,285 votes (1.5 percent) in his second race against Scalise.

Committee assignments

 Committee on Energy and Commerce
 Subcommittee on Communications and Technology
 Subcommittee on Energy and Power
 Subcommittee on Oversight and Investigations
Select Subcommittee on the Coronavirus Crisis (Ranking Member)

Caucus memberships
 Congressional Western Caucus
Republican Study Committee

Tenure
In 2011, Scalise became a co-sponsor of Bill H.R. 3261, otherwise known as the Stop Online Piracy Act (withdrawn January 23, 2012). As chairman of the Republican Study Committee, Scalise dismissed Derek Khanna, a committee staffer, in December 2012 because of pressure from content industry lobbyists after the study committee published a memo advocating copyright reform.

In 2013, Scalise voted against reauthorizing the Violence Against Women Act. Also in 2013, Scalise sponsored a bill called the FCC Consolidated Reporting Act. The bill makes the Federal Communications Commission (FCC) consolidate several of their reports into one report.

In December 2017, Scalise voted in favor of the Tax Cuts and Jobs Act. Scalise says that the bill will "put more money in the pockets of hard-working families."

Scalise was the ranking Republican on the House Select Subcommittee on the Coronavirus Crisis during the May 19, 2021, hearings involving Emergent BioSolutions founder Faud El-Hibiri and its CEO Robert G. Kramer.

Leadership race
In the aftermath of Rep. Eric Cantor's unexpected defeat by Dave Brat on June 10, 2014, Scalise launched a campaign to replace Rep. Kevin McCarthy in the position of Majority Whip of the House; McCarthy himself would replace Cantor as House Majority Leader. Scalise's ascent to leadership built on his "come-from-behind win in 2012 to become chairman" of the Republican Study Committee. Scalise subsequently won a three-way race for whip, winning on the first ballot despite the efforts of fellow candidates Peter Roskam and Marlin Stutzman. He came under fire for using the assistance of a federal lobbyist, John Feehery, when hiring staff for the Majority Leader's Press Office.

Congressional baseball shooting

On June 14, 2017, at 7:09am EDT, Scalise and three other people were shot and wounded by James Hodgkinson, an extremist with a record of domestic violence, who opened fire with a rifle during a baseball practice of the Republican team for the annual Congressional Baseball Game. The practice was taking place at the Eugene Simpson Baseball Fields in the Del Ray neighborhood of Alexandria, Virginia. Scalise, the only member of Congress to be hit, was shot in the hip. Representative Mo Brooks, who was also at the practice, witnessed the attack and said he saw someone with a rifle behind the third base dugout. Brooks then heard Scalise scream from second base. Scalise crawled into right field, bleeding. Senator Jeff Flake and Representative Brad Wenstrup, a former podiatrist, ran to assist Scalise after Hodgkinson was shot. Senator Rand Paul, also a witness, said he heard "as many as 50 shots".

Initially conscious, Scalise went into shock while being taken to MedStar Washington Hospital Center in critical condition, where he underwent immediate surgery. He was hit by a single rifle bullet that "travelled across his pelvis, fracturing bones, injuring internal organs, and causing severe bleeding". Dr. Jack Sava at the MedStar Washington Hospital Center said that "when he arrived, he was in critical condition with an imminent risk of death". By June 16, although still in critical condition, Sava said, "We have controlled internal bleeding and his vital signs have stabilized." On June 17, it was announced that his condition had improved to "serious" and he was responsive enough to talk with his family. On June 21, the hospital issued a press release stating: "Congressman Steve Scalise continues to make good progress. He is now listed in fair condition and is beginning an extended period of healing and rehabilitation."

On July 5, 2017, Scalise returned to the intensive care unit after becoming ill with an infection related to the shooting.

On July 13, 2017, it was reported that Scalise had undergone additional surgery and that his condition had been upgraded to fair. He was discharged from the hospital on July 26 and went through a period of inpatient rehabilitation. On September 28, to applause and cheers, he returned to the House of Representatives, where he gave a speech about his experience related to the traumatic events.

Hodgkinson, 66, was killed by police at the scene. He was married and lived in Belleville, Illinois, where he owned a small business doing home inspections, mold testing, and air-quality testing. He had encounters with police involving violence or firearms in 2006 and 2017; he was registered as a firearms owner in Illinois. In January 2017 he closed down his business. In the months before the shooting he was living in a car near the Alexandria baseball field and regularly visited a nearby YMCA. He was a Bernie Sanders supporter and volunteer, and a fierce critic of Trump and the Republican Party on social media, in letters to the editor, and in phone calls to his representative. Virginia Attorney General Mark Herring concluded Hodgkinson was "fueled by rage against Republican legislators" and the shooting was "an act of terrorism."

House Minority Whip
The Republicans lost their majority in the 2018 House of Representatives elections, and Scalise was elected as House Minority Whip, with Kevin McCarthy of California as Minority Leader. While as Majority Whip he was the third-ranking House Republican behind Speaker Paul Ryan and McCarthy, as Minority Whip he is second in command behind McCarthy.

2020 presidential election and aftermath

On January 6, 2021, Scalise voted to de-certify President-elect Biden's victories in Arizona and Pennsylvania.

Scalise condemned the Capitol attack as terrorism and compared it to the Congressional baseball shooting. "It would ... be naive to think the [2017] shooter arrived at his decision in a vacuum", Scalise said, adding, "It would be equally naive to think that the Capitol rioters arrived at their decisions in a void. Violent rhetoric helps radicalize people. Republicans and Democrats alike must have the moral clarity to call this language out whenever it is spoken, not only when it comes from the other side of the political aisle."

In February 2021, more than a month after Joe Biden's inauguration, Scalise refused to acknowledge that the election was not stolen or fraudulent. In May 2021, he called for the ouster of Liz Cheney as House Republican Conference Chair due to her vote to impeach Trump for inciting a mob to attack the U.S. Capitol. On May 19, 2021, Scalise and the seven other House Republican leaders voted against establishing a national commission to investigate the January 6, 2021, attack on the United States Capitol Complex. Thirty-five House Republicans and all 217 Democrats present voted to establish such a commission.

In October 2021, Fox News anchor Chris Wallace interviewed Scalise. In the aftermath of controversy surrounding the 2020 presidential election, Scalise refused to acknowledge the loss of president Donald Trump. His refusal to admit Trump's loss was viewed as fear of Trump's vindictiveness and willingness to kowtow to Trump in order to avoid being targeted by Trump.

2022 elections 
The House Republican Conference elected Scalise to serve as Majority Leader during the 118th Congress. Scalise was unopposed for the position.

Political positions

Immigration
Scalise supported President Donald Trump's 2017 executive order temporarily banning citizens of seven Muslim-majority countries from entering the U.S. He stated, "It's very prudent to say, 'Let's be careful about who comes into our country to make sure that they're not terrorists.'"

Health care 
Scalise opposes the Affordable Care Act. Scalise applauded a Texas district court ruling the Affordable Care Act was unconstitutional in its entirety.

Gun law 

Scalise has been an opponent of gun control and was given an "A+ rating" from the National Rifle Association. After being shot, and in the wake of the 2017 Las Vegas shooting, Scalise said on Meet the Press that he is still a gun rights supporter: "Don't try to put new laws in place that don't fix these problems. They only make it harder for law-abiding citizens to own a gun." Scalise has described the Second Amendment as "unlimited".

In 2018, Scalise co-sponsored a bill to "strengthen school safety and security", which required a two-thirds vote for passage given that it was brought up under an expedited process known as Suspension of the Rules. The House voted 407–10 to approve the bill, which would "provide $50 million a year for a new federal grant program to train students, teachers and law enforcement on how to spot and report signs of gun violence". Named STOP (Students, Teachers, and Officers Preventing) School Violence Act, it would "develop anonymous telephone and online systems where people could report threats of violence." At the same time, it would authorize $25 million for schools to improve and harden their security, such as installing new locks, lights, metal detectors and panic buttons. A separate spending bill would be required to provide money for the grant program.

Cannabis

Scalise opposes the legalization of marijuana, which he deems a gateway drug for other drugs. He has a "D" rating from National Organization for the Reform of Marijuana Laws for his voting history regarding cannabis-related causes.

LGBT rights 

According to the Washington Blade, Scalise has one of "the most anti-LGBT reputations of any lawmaker". He opposed the repeal of the US military's Don't Ask Don't Tell policy and including sexuality under hate crime legislation. He also opposes same-sex marriage, having praised the 2014 Robicheaux v. Caldwell ruling. Scalise condemned the Supreme Court decision Obergefell v. Hodges, which held that same-sex marriage bans violate the constitution. Scalise's voting record has a zero rating from the LGBT advocacy group Human Rights Campaign.

Environment 
Scalise rejects the scientific consensus on climate change. He has on multiple occasions falsely claimed that the scientific community used to accept notions of global cooling.

Other events

Speech at white nationalist convention
In 2002, Scalise was a speaker at a convention for the European-American Unity and Rights Organization (EURO), a group which was founded by David Duke. This became known in 2014 after political blogger Lamar White, Jr. uncovered anonymous comments from 2002 on Stormfront, a white supremacist website, which made reference to Scalise as a 2002 speaker at the convention. Scalise confirmed that he had spoken at the EURO conference in 2002 and stated at the time he did not know of the "racist nature of the group". Scalise said he spoke about state tax legislation and that EURO was "one of the many groups that I spoke to regarding this critical legislation," further stating that this is a group "whose views I wholeheartedly condemn." Scalise apologized for speaking to the group, saying, "It was a mistake I regret, and I emphatically oppose the divisive racial and religious views groups like these hold." After Scalise's attendance at the conference was publicized in 2014, journalist Stephanie Grace alleged that Scalise had once called himself "David Duke without the baggage".

Various Louisiana politicians, including Republican Governor Bobby Jindal and Democratic Congressman Cedric Richmond, defended Scalise's character. Speaker of the House John Boehner voiced his continued confidence in Scalise as Majority Whip. Several Democratic members of Congress, as well as Mo Elleithee, a spokesperson for the Democratic National Committee (DNC), criticized Scalise and challenged his statement that he was not aware of the group's affiliation with racism and anti-Semitism. Mark Potok of the Southern Poverty Law Center called upon Scalise to step down from his leadership position as Majority Whip.

Ady Barkan video
In 2020, Scalise spread a video that was doctored to depict the political activist Ady Barkan, who is disabled and uses a speech-generating device, asking 2020 presidential candidate Joe Biden whether he supported defunding police, to which Biden appeared to reply in the affirmative. Barkan asked Scalise to delete the video, which was flagged by Twitter as manipulated media, and apologize. Scalise deleted the video; his spokesperson said that editing the video in this manner was "common practice."

Personal life
A Roman Catholic, Scalise married Jennifer Ann Letulle on April 9, 2005. They have two children.

On June 30, 2018, a man left death threats against Scalise and his family. The suspect, Carlos Bayon, was later convicted, and sentenced to five years in prison. He is appealing his conviction.

See also

List of United States Congress members killed or wounded in office

References

External links

 Congressman Steve Scalise official U.S. House website
 Republican Whip official website
 Steve Scalise for Congress
 
 
 

|-

|-

|-

|-

|-

|-

|-

1965 births
21st-century American politicians
21st-century Roman Catholics
Archbishop Rummel High School alumni
American shooting survivors
American people of Italian descent
American Roman Catholics
Catholics from Louisiana
Italian-American culture in Louisiana
Living people
Republican Party Louisiana state senators
Louisiana State University alumni
Republican Party members of the Louisiana House of Representatives
People from Jefferson Parish, Louisiana
Politicians from New Orleans
Republican Party members of the United States House of Representatives from Louisiana
Majority leaders of the United States House of Representatives
20th-century American politicians
Conservatism in the United States